Paul Victor Ernst Dahlke (12 April 1904 – 23 November 1984) was a German stage and film actor.

Career 
Dahlke was born in Gross Streitz (today Strzezenice, Poland) near Köslin in Farther Pomerania. He visited school in Köslin, Stargard and passed his Abitur in Dortmund in 1922. Dahlke started to study at the Clausthal University of Technology and the Technical University of Berlin but also attended some lectures in German philology and dramatics.

In 1927, Dahlke was a scholar of Max Reinhardt's drama school and appeared at different stages in Berlin and Munich in 1929. He became a member of the Deutsches Theater ensemble in 1934 until its closedown in 1944 and was awarded a Staatsschauspieler in 1937. Throughout the 1930s he worked with popular actors like Emil Jannings, Zarah Leander, Lil Dagover or Lída Baarová.

After World War II Dahlke worked at the Staatsschauspiel Munich and embodied characters like Carl Zuckmayer's Des Teufels General or Professor Higgins in George Bernard Shaw's Pygmalion. He became popular by several TV productions in the 1970s, e.g. his appearance in The Old Fox, Derrick or Der Kommissar.

Dahlke was the German dubbing voice of Charles Laughton and Vincent Price.

Dahlke died in Salzburg and is buried at Grundlsee, Austria. He was married to the actress Elfe Gerhart.

Filmography

1934: Love, Death and the Devil – The Governor
1935: Joan of Arc
1935: Lady Windermere's Fan – Bankier Brown
1936: The Traitor – Agent Geyer
1937: Fridericus – Field Marshal General von Dessau
1937: My Son the Minister – Vaccarés
1937: Patriots – Charles
1937: Daphne and the Diplomat – Dr. Kolbe
1937: The Broken Jug – Ruprecht Tümpel, sein Sohn
1938: Urlaub auf Ehrenwort – Direktor des Herrschaftshauses
1938: Schwarzfahrt ins Glück – Im- und Exporteur Carlo Sylvester
1938: Capriccio – Cesaire
1938: Covered Tracks – Henry Poquet – Boulevardschriftsteller
1938: Pour le Mérite – Herr Schnaase
1938: Women for Golden Hill – Barryman
1939: War es der im 3. Stock? – Heidenreich, Kriminalkommissar
1939: Die Hochzeitsreise – Jean Jacques Bouffart, Private Detective
1939: Morgen werde ich verhaftet – Kriminalkommissar Brinkmann
1939: The Life and Loves of Tschaikovsky – Iwan Casarowitsch Glykow, Music publisher
1939: The Merciful Lie – Jean Goban
1939: Who's Kissing Madeleine? – Kommissar Watson
1939: Robert Koch – Lehrer
1939: Die unheimlichen Wünsche – Canais, Feodoras Lakai und Geliebter
1939: Kennwort Machin – Jürgen Borb, Kassierer der Dadag, alias A. Machin
1939: Liberated Hands – Thomsen
1940: The Girl from Barnhelm – Just
1940: Enemies -Fährmann
1940: Friedrich Schiller – The Triumph of a Genius – Class Sergeant Riess
1940:  – Edgar Simon
1941: Riding for Germany – Dolinski
1941: Venus on Trial – Gottlieb Böller, Bürgermeister
1941: Kameraden – Rappel, Bursche
1941: Die Kellnerin Anna – Malwoda
1941: Heimaterde
1942: Andreas Schlüter – Erzgießer Jacobi
1942: Beloved World – Professor Strickbach
1942: Doctor Crippen – Defense lawyer
1942: Fünftausend Mark Belohnung – Kriminalkommissar Helling
1943: I Entrust My Wife to You – Boxer Alois
1943: Romance in a Minor Key – Madeleine's husband
1943: Gefährlicher Frühling – Albert Ludwig Babian, Schuldirektor
1944: Seine beste Rolle – Diener Sebastian
1944: I Need You – Direktor Heinrich Scholz
1944: Der Täter ist unter uns – Kriminalrat a.D. Adrian
1944: Das war mein Leben – Dr. Berner
1944: Orient Express – Police Commisar Iwanowitsch
1945: A Man Like Maximilian – Theaterdirektor Rother
1945:  – Leutnant von Gorschewski
1947: And If We Should Meet Again – Studienrat Bockendahl
1948: Menschen in Gottes Hand – Vater Renken
1948: The Lost Face – Axel Witt
1948: The Original Sin
1948: The Time with You – Die Zeit mit dir 
1948: Insolent and in Love – Hennemann, Diener und Chauffeur
1949: Long Is the Road – 2nd Doctor
1949:  – Philipp Geiger
1949: Trouble Backstairs – August Krüger
1949: Encounter with Werther – Napoleon
1949: Der Posaunist – Robert
1949: The Trip to Marrakesh – Henry Orliac
1949: The Prisoner – Emil Karge, 2. Posaunist
1949: Das Gesetz der Liebe – Leutnant von Gorschewski
1950: Kein Engel ist so rein – Fritz
1950:  – Thomas Gossip
1950: The Rabanser Case – Dr. Georg Rabanser
1950: The Disturbed Wedding Night – Hammok, Diener
1950: The Falling Star – Viktor Hollreiser
1951: One Night's Intoxication – Generaldirektor Siebel
1951: Falschmünzer am Werk – Inspektor Paillard
1952: Weekend in Paradise – Regierungsrat Dittjen
1952: The Day Before the Wedding – Bürgermeister
1952: Shooting Stars – Gerhard Sommer
1953: Don't Forget Love – Dr. Franz Kienzel
1953: Arlette Conquers Paris – Justizminister
1953: Once I Will Return – John Rick
1954: The Great Lola – Emil Dornwald
1954: Clivia – Potterton
1954: Love is Forever – Mr. Vogelreuther
1954: The Flying Classroom – Justus
1954: Three from Variety 
1955: Three Men in the Snow – Geheimrat Eduard Schlüter
1955: Her First Date – Martin, Literaturprofessor
1955: Request Concert – Direktor Knoll
1955: My Children and I – Otto Baumann
1955:  – Karl Hoffmann
1956: Fruit Without Love – Prof. Schillinger
1956: Die Ehe des Dr. med. Danwitz – Fritz Hambach – Fabrikant
1956: The First Day of Spring – Robert Hiller
1956: Kitty and the Great Big World – Henry Dupont
1957: Stresemann – Reich-President Friedrich Ebert
1957:  – Werkmeister Löber
1957: Confessions of Felix Krull – Professor Kuckuck
1957: Liebe, wie die Frau sie wünscht – Professor Liborius
1957: Different from You and Me – Bankdirektor Werner Teichmann
1957:  – Stadtrat Hugo Bunzel
1958: All the Sins of the Earth – Dr. Volkert
1959: Dubrowsky – Dubrowski
1959: The Scarlet Baroness – Oberst Urbaneck
1959:  – Ara's father
1959: The Head – Police Commissioner Sturm
1959: Liebe, Luft und lauter Lügen – Vater Rössle
1959: Love Now, Pay Later – Herr Reimer, Mieter
1959: Abschied von den Wolken – Dr. Quartz
1959: Triplets on Board – Emilio
1960: Ein Student ging vorbei – Apotheker Brandt
1961: Jedermann – Mammon
1961: Sansibar (TV Movie) – Herr Knudsen
1962: Das Mädchen und der Staatsanwalt – Vorsitzender
1962:  – Dr. Berger
1963: The Black Cobra – Dr.Langhammer, Kommissar
1963:  – Generaldirektor Brock
1963: The House in Montevideo – Pastor Riesling
1964: Encounter in Salzburg – Insurance Director
1964: The Secret of the Chinese Carnation – Reginald Sheridan
1965: Red Dragon – Harris
1965: Situation Hopeless... But Not Serious – Herr Neusel
1967: The Heathens of Kummerow – Pastor Breithaupt
1969:  – Amtsgerichtsrat Kiesewetter
1970:  – Friedrich Wilhelm Berthold
1973:  – Dr. Paul Heizer
1974:  (TV film) – Gabriel Betteredge
1975:  (TV Mini-Series) – Graf Bosch
1978: MS Franziska (TV Series) – Jakob Wilde
1978:  (Diamantenpfade) – Prof. Otto von Heyden
1983: Derrick (TV Series, Season 10, Episode 2: "Die Tote in der Isar") – Josef Matusek

Awards 
1937: Staatsschauspieler
1966: Culture Award of the Pomeranian Landsmannschaft
1974: Filmband in Gold
1979: Great Cross of Merit of the Federal Republic of Germany Bundesrepublik Deutschland

References

External links
 
 Paul Dahlke at www.filmportal.de
 Photographs of Paul Dahlke

1904 births
1984 deaths
Commanders Crosses of the Order of Merit of the Federal Republic of Germany
German male film actors
German male stage actors
German male television actors
People from Koszalin County
People from the Province of Pomerania
20th-century German male actors